Rubdown is a 1993 Beverly Hills-set television thriller film directed by Stuart Cooper and starring Michelle Phillips, Jack Coleman, William Devane, and Catherine Oxenberg.

Cast
Michelle Phillips as Jordana Orwitz
Jack Coleman as Marion Pooley
Kent Willians as Armstorong
Alan Thicke as Raymond Holliman
Catherine Oxenberg as Jordy
William Devane as Harry Orwitz
Jack Angeles as Micky
Michael Ray Miller as Protsky
Ron Johnson as Theo
Kane Hodder as Simon

Plot
When a businessman is found dead with a bullet in his head and his wife vanishes, the masseur she was having an affair with becomes a murder suspect.  The masseur is former baseball player Marion Pooley (Jack Coleman), who was offered $50,000 by the dead businessman, to sleep with the woman who has disappeared.

Release
The film premiered on the USA Network on September 15, 1993.

Critical response
Denise McIver of Variety panned the film, writing: "The most disturbing thing about this two-hour cable telefilm is its cynicism and the fact that none of the characters seemed redeemed, or at least changed, by their experiences. This is not to say it won’t hold one’s interest, if only for the scenario, which delivers lots of bare backs, naked legs and superficially steamy sex scenes." Glenn Kenny alternately praised the film, writing: "Despite Rubdowns multiple improbabilities, this story of murder and faked identities is surprisingly absorbing, mostly due to its sassy dialogue."

References

External links

1993 television films
1993 films
1990s erotic thriller films